Ocklawaha (also spelled Oklawaha) is an unincorporated community and census-designated place (CDP) in Marion County, Florida, United States. As of the 2020 census, the population was 1,508. The community is part of the Ocala Metropolitan Statistical Area.

History
A post office was established at Ocklawaha in 1884. The area has its own postal district (32179) and post office. The community took its name from the nearby Ocklawaha River.

The Shootout

In 1935, Ocklawaha was the scene of a shootout between federal agents and Barker-Karpis Gang member Fred Barker. The agents fired about 500 bullets into the house, with roughly 250 shots fired in return, according to the after-action report of Special Agent in Charge Earl "E.J." Connelley. The fight ended in the deaths of Fred Barker and his mother Kate "Ma" Barker. Each year, the Ocklawaha Chamber of Commerce puts on a reenactment of the event.

FBI agents discovered the hideout of the Barker-Karpis Gang after Arthur "Doc" Barker (one of Ma Barker's sons) was arrested in Chicago on January 8, 1935. A map found in Arthur's possession indicated that other gang members were in Ocklawaha. The FBI soon located the house where the gang was staying after identifying references to a local alligator named "Gator Joe", mentioned in a letter sent to Arthur. The gang had rented the property under the pseudonym "Blackburn", claiming to be a mother and sons wanting to vacation in a country retreat.

Agents surrounded the house at what is now 13250 East Highway C-25 on the morning of January 16, 1935. The FBI were not aware that Alvin Karpis and other gang members had left three days before, leaving only Fred and Ma in the house. The agents ordered them to surrender, but Fred Barker (and possibly "Ma" Barker) opened fire at 7 A.M.; both he and his mother were killed by federal agents after an intense shootout lasted for four-and-a-half hours. During the shootout, Fred almost killed FBI Special Agent James Campbell "Doc" White (who was taking cover behind a tree)—at the same time, Special Agent in Charge Earl "E.J." Connelley shot and wounded Fred in the neck. Allegedly, many local people came to watch the events unfolding, even holding picnics during the gunfire. Gunfire from the house finally stopped at 11:30 A.M., and the FBI ordered local estate handyman Willie Woodbury to enter the house wearing a bulletproof vest. Woodbury reported that there was no one inside alive. It was believed that Fred and Ma were killed by heavy gunfire while McDade and Muzzey fired tear gas.

It isn't known if Ma Barker fired a gun during the shootout—or if Ma Barker was directly involved with any criminal activity. She certainly knew that her sons were criminals.

Both bodies were found in the same front bedroom. Fred was killed after being shot 14 times; including three times in the head.  Ma appeared to have died from a single bullet wound in the skull. According to the FBI's account, a Tommy gun was found lying in her hands. Other sources say that it was lying between the bodies of Ma and Fred.  Their bodies were put on public display, and then stored unclaimed until October 1, 1935, when relatives had them buried at Williams Timberhill Cemetery in Welch, Oklahoma, next to the body of Herman Barker.

The FBI agents who were involved in the shootout were:
 15-year-veteran Special Agent in Charge Earl "E.J." Connelley (a US Army veteran; who served in World War I) 
 11-year-veteran Special Agent James Campbell “Doc” White (who was a Texas Ranger for 18 years) 
 5-year-veteran Special Agent John Madala
 5-year-veteran Special Agent Ralph D. Brown (who served as a pilot for United States Marines Corps from 1925 until 1930)
 5-year-veteran Special Agent Samuel K. McKee, Jr. (who was involved in the death of Pretty Boy Floyd)
 3-year-veteran Special Agent Daniel P. Sullivan
 eight-month-rookie Agent Thomas Mario McDade (who served in the 1934 Battle of Barrington. in 1942 he joined the United States Army (Bronze Star) and attained the rank of Lieutenant Colonel.)
 eight-month-rookie Agent Alexander A. Muzzey
 eight-month-rookie Agent Charles Jerald "Jerry" Campbell (who served with Oklahoma City Police Department for 5 years) 
 eight-month-rookie Agent Grier Cornelius Woltz
 Special Agent Charles Winstead (who was the agent thought to have fired the bullet outside the Biograph Theater that killed John Dillinger)
 Special Agent Richard L. Jones
 Special Agent Thomas Melvin
 Special Agent Joseph Thomas McLaughlin

Geography
Ocklawaha is located in southeastern Marion County at  (29.0425, -81.9294), on the north shore of Lake Weir. It is bordered to the east by Silver Springs Shores East.

The water area is mainly in Lake Weir to the south, with the rest in Bowers Lake on the western edge of the community.

See also

References

External links

Census-designated places in Marion County, Florida
Census-designated places in Florida
Unincorporated communities in Marion County, Florida
Unincorporated communities in Florida